Simon Thoreson (May 29, 1849 – March 20, 1918) was a merchant, businessman and elected official. He served as a member of the Wisconsin State Assembly.

Biography
Simon Thoreson was born in Norway in 1849. He moved with his parents as a child to Polk County, Wisconsin in 1862.

Career
In 1876, Thoreson  moved to Grantsburg, Wisconsin where he operated a general store and formed a partnership under the firm name of Oleson & Thoreson. Thoreson served as an officer of the First Bank of Grantsburg. He also held an interest in the Hickerson Roller Mill at Grantsburg, the Burnett County Abstract Company and the Grantsburg Starch Factory. 
  
Thoreson was elected to the Assembly in 1902, where he served on the committee for privileges and elections. Previously, he had served as Director of the Grantsburg School Board, Chairman of the Burnett County, Wisconsin Republican Committee and Chairman of the Burnett County Board.

References

Norwegian emigrants to the United States
People from Polk County, Wisconsin
People from Grantsburg, Wisconsin
County supervisors in Wisconsin
Republican Party members of the Wisconsin State Assembly
American Lutherans
1849 births
1918 deaths
19th-century American politicians
19th-century Lutherans